Kushkul (Quşkül) is a rural locality (a village) in Mikhaylovsky Selsoviet, Aurgazinsky District, Bashkortostan, Russia. The population was 58 as of 2010. There is 1 street.

Geography 
Kushkul is located 18 km southwest of Tolbazy (the district's administrative centre) by road. Tashtamak is the nearest rural locality.

References 

Rural localities in Aurgazinsky District